Malacoctenus gilli, the dusky blenny, is a species of labrisomid blenny native to the Atlantic Ocean including the Gulf of Mexico and the Caribbean Sea from the Bahamas to the north coast of South America. It can reach a length of  TL. The person honoured in the patronym of this species was not identified by Steindachner but it is most probably the American ichthyologist Theodore Nicholas Gill (1837-1914), the authority for the generic name Malacoctenus.

References

gilli
Fauna of Bermuda
Fish of the Caribbean
Fish described in 1867